Marine Medium Tiltrotor Squadron 166 (VMM-166) was a United States Marine Corps tiltrotor squadron consisting of MV-22 Osprey transport  aircraft. The squadron, known as the "SeaElk", was last based at Marine Corps Air Station Miramar, California.  Activated in 1985, HMM-166 was the youngest CH-46 helicopter squadron in the Marine Corps.  The squadron was redesignated as a tiltrotor squadron on June 23, 2010. The squadron was deactivated on October 1, 2021.

History

The squadron was activated on September 13, 1985 at Marine Corps Air Station Tustin, California and assigned to Marine Aircraft Group 16.  They relocated during 1995 to Marine Corps Air Station El Toro, California and again during 1999 to MCAS Miramar, California.

166 has been active in:
 1990 - Operation Desert Shield
 1991 - Operation Desert Storm
 1994 - Operation Support Hope
 1994 - Operation Restore Hope
 1998 - Operation Southern Watch
 2004 - Operation Iraqi Freedom

In 2004, HMM-166 deployed as the aviation combat element of the 11th Marine Expeditionary Unit in support of Operation Iraqi Freedom.  During this deployment they participated in the Battle of Najaf.

On November 5, 2007, the squadron deployed to the Western Pacific as the aviation combat element of the 11th Marine Expeditionary Unit.  From December 4 to 6, as part of the 11th MEU, HMM-166 flew 29 humanitarian assistance missions over Bangladesh to transport more than 54,165 pounds of food and supplies and 1875 gallons of water to the people most affected by Tropical Cyclone Sidr.

On 5 May 2009, a SuperCobra belonging to the squadron crashed at 1154 hrs PST into the Cleveland National Forest, California.  The crash resulted in the fatalities of the aircraft's two pilots, Jessica Conkling, 27, and Aaron Cox, 26. The SuperCobra had departed Naval Air Facility El Centro 30–40 minutes earlier for Marine Corps Air Station Miramar.  The cause of the crash was an improperly secured transmission cover which came off in flight and struck the tail rotor.

 

In September 2009, HMM-166(REIN) again deployed as the aviation combat element of the 11th Marine Expeditionary Unit.  They participated in exercises in East Timor, Indonesia, United Arab Emirates, Kuwait and Djibouti.  They returned from the deployment in April 2010.  The squadron was redesignated as VMM-166 on June 23, 2010 as they transitioned to the MV-22 Osprey.

On October 1, 2021, VMM-166 was decommissioned at Marine Corps Air Station Miramar, CA as a result of Marine Corps decisions from Force Design 2030.

Unit awards
A unit citation or commendation is an award bestowed upon an organization for the action cited. Members of the unit who participated in said actions are allowed to wear on their uniforms the awarded unit citation. HMM-166 has been presented with the following awards:

See also

 United States Marine Corps Aviation
 Organization of the United States Marine Corps
 List of active United States Marine Corps aircraft squadrons

References

External links

 

VMM166